Robert C. Field (May 6, 1804 – June 16, 1876) was an American politician and businessman.

Born in Cairo, New York, he studied law for a few years while in New York. He served in the New York State Assembly from Greene County, New York in 1844. In 1849, he moved to Richland County, Wisconsin and served in the Wisconsin State Assembly in 1859. He moved to Trempealeau County, Wisconsin and served in the Wisconsin State Senate 1874–1875. He also served in the Trempealeau County Board of Supervisors and was in the mercantile business. He died in Osseo, Wisconsin.

Notes

1804 births
1876 deaths
People from Cairo, New York
People from Richland County, Wisconsin
People from Trempealeau County, Wisconsin
Businesspeople from Wisconsin
County supervisors in Wisconsin
Members of the New York State Assembly
Members of the Wisconsin State Assembly
Wisconsin state senators
19th-century American politicians
19th-century American businesspeople